Magic Circus was a nightclub in Mexico City. It opened in 1982 and was located at 3 Rodolfo Gaona, Lomas De Sotelo.

The club was a complex of three venues: "Magic Circus", the main club, "Privilege", a private membership club, and "Rock Garage", later named "Dynamo Garage".

Magic Circus was the symbol of status and snobbery with celebrities in the late 1980s and early 1990s. Rock and pop concerts with artists such as Soda Stereo, Mecano, Flans, Luis Miguel, as well as electronic dance music by DJ's, were the trademark of the venue. The club was also known for its resident DJ's, including Claudio Yarto, Manuel Novoa, Joaquin Díaz, Luis Gallegos, Yaxkin Restrepo, Mauricio Ponce, Ángel Arciniega Jr., Luis Ángel Hernández and Ulises Jiménez (who was the last DJ who closed the place on Sunday, 29 May 1994, although two weeks later it was reopened by the new owners, it was only called Magic, but it no longer belonged to the Magic Circus chain). It was one of the meeting points of B-boys like Speed Fire and Rapaz, as well as other people in the industry.

Magic Circus opened venues in Huatulco, Oaxaca, Acapulco, Ixtapa and Zihuatanejo in the early 1990s, now all closed.

References

See also

List of electronic dance music venues

Buildings and structures in Mexico City
Nightclubs
Electronic dance music venues